Simply Delicioso is a cooking show hosted by Ingrid Hoffmann, wherein she typically teaches the audience Latin-American and Latin-American-style recipes. A recipe book of the same name was also published.

References

External links
 

2000s American cooking television series
Food Network original programming
2007 American television series debuts
2009 American television series endings